Saco is an unincorporated community in Pike County, Alabama. It is located 13 miles northeast of Troy, Alabama.

History
A post office was established as Saco in 1905, and remained in operation until it was discontinued in 1960.

References 

Unincorporated communities in Pike County, Alabama
Unincorporated communities in Alabama